WKSK-FM is a classic hits formatted broadcast radio station licensed to South Hill, Virginia, serving South Hill, Lawrenceville and Victoria in Virginia.  WKSK-FM is owned by Thomas Birch's Birch Broadcasting Corporation, through licensee Lakes Media, LLC.

References

External links
Rewind 101.9 Online

1966 establishments in Virginia
Classic hits radio stations in the United States
Radio stations established in 1966
KSK